The 1946 Wiley Wildcats football team was an American football team that represented Wiley College in the Southwestern Athletic Conference (SWAC) during the 1946 college football season. In their 24th season under head coach Fred T. Long, the team compiled a 6–3–1 record (4–2 against SWAC opponents), finished in second place in the SWAC, and outscored opponents by a total of 234 to 65.

The Dickinson System rated Wiley in a tie for No. 12 among the black college football teams for 1946.

Schedule

References

Wiley
Wiley Wildcats football seasons
Wiley Wildcats football